Bruno Masciardi (24 February 1914 – 8 May 2001) was a Swiss sprint canoer who competed in the late 1940s. At the 1948 Summer Olympics in London, he was eliminated in the heats of the K-2 1000 m event. He was born in Basel, where he also died.

References
Bruno Masciadri's profile at Sports Reference.com

External links
 

Canoeists at the 1948 Summer Olympics
Olympic canoeists of Switzerland
Swiss male canoeists
1914 births
2001 deaths